Jazz Jennings (born October 6, 2000) is an American YouTube personality, spokesmodel, television personality, and LGBT rights activist. Jennings is one of the youngest publicly documented people to be identified as transgender. Jennings received national attention in 2007 when an interview with Barbara Walters aired on 20/20, which led to other high-profile interviews and appearances. Christine Connelly, a member of the board of directors for the Boston Alliance of Gay, Lesbian, Bisexual, and Transgender Youth, stated, "She was the first young person who picked up the national spotlight, went on TV and was able to articulate her perspective and point of view with such innocence." Her parents noted that Jennings was clear on being female as soon as she could speak.

Jennings is an honorary co-founder of the TransKids Purple Rainbow Foundation, which her parents founded in 2007 to assist transgender youth. In 2013, she founded Purple Rainbow Tails, a company in which she fashions rubber mermaid tails to raise money for transgender children. Jennings hosts a series of YouTube videos about her life, titled "I Am Jazz". She stars in the TLC reality TV series, I Am Jazz, which premiered in 2015 and focuses on her daily life with her family and the challenges she faces as a transgender person.

Early life and education
Jennings was born in Florida to parents Greg and Jeanette. She has an older sister, Ari, and older twin brothers Sander and Griffen. The family is Jewish. Regarding the last name, Jeanette explained that "Jennings is our pseudonym, to sort of make life easier. We try to hide our real last name as much as possible...Our last name is a very Jewish, long last name." 

Jennings was assigned male at birth and was diagnosed with gender dysphoria by age five, making her one of the youngest publicly documented people to be identified as transgender. Jennings made it clear as soon as she could speak that she was female, and, although the family presented her publicly in gender-neutral clothing, she wanted to be presented in feminine clothing.

As a child, Jennings went to Camp Aranu'tiq, the first sleepaway camp for transgender children. She graduated from Broward Virtual School in 2019 and was the valedictorian of her class. She was accepted to Harvard University, but delayed entry for a year.

Career

At six years old, Jennings and her family began appearing on television to speak about the challenges of growing up transgender. Her story has been covered by national television shows 20/20 and The Rosie Show, where she appeared alongside Chaz Bono.

In 2007, Jennings's parents founded TransKids Purple Rainbow Foundation to assist transgender youth; she is an honorary co-founder of the organization.

In 2011, I Am Jazz: A Family in Transition, a documentary about her life and family, premiered on the Oprah Winfrey Network.

In 2013, Jennings founded Purple Rainbow Tails, a company in which she fashions rubber mermaid tails to raise money for transgender children. That same year, in a follow-up interview with Barbara Walters on 20/20, they discussed Jennings' two-and-a-half-year battle with the United States Soccer Federation (USSF), the governing US body for the sport, to allow her to play on girls' teams. Aided by the National Center for Lesbian Rights, she succeeded in changing the USSF's policies to allow trans students to play.

Jennings co-wrote the 2014 children's book, I Am Jazz, with Jessica Herthel, the director of the Stonewall National Education Project. The book details her life as a transgender child. According to libertarian magazine Reason, "I Am Jazz is one of the most banned books in the [United States]".

In 2014, Jennings was a guest at the GLAAD Media Awards, sharing the stage with Zach Wahls and Lauren Foster. That year she was also named one of "The 25 Most Influential Teens of 2014" by Time, and recognized as the youngest person ever featured on Outs "Out 100" and Advocates "40 Under 40" lists. She was also named in OUTs 2014 Trans 100 list, named a Human Rights Campaign Youth Ambassador, and received LogoTV's 2014 Youth Trailblazer Award. In March 2015, Johnson & Johnson announced a deal for Jennings to appear in Clean & Clear commercials. Jennings became a spokesmodel for Clean & Clear's "See The Real Me" digital campaign and shared "the trials of growing up transgender." She also modeled for the NOH8 Campaign. She also authored a piece for Time magazine's 100 Most Influential People List, writing the entry for Laverne Cox.

The day-to-day life of Jennings and her family are documented in the TLC reality series I Am Jazz, which debuted in July 2015. In 2016, Jennings published a memoir, Being Jazz: My Life as a (Transgender) Teen.

In 2017, Robert Tonner and the Tonner Doll Company announced plans to produce a doll modeled after Jennings. It is the first doll to be marketed as transgender. The same year, Jennings voiced a teenage transgender character, Zadie, in the season finale of the Amazon Video animated series Danger & Eggs, who sings about acceptance, helping the two protagonists understand the meaning of a chosen family. Jennings described the experience as "groundbreaking," saying she was proud to be part of the show, especially in an episode that takes place at "a Pride event," saying it makes the role significant, meaningful, powerful, and special. In 2018, it was announced Jennings would star in a short film called Denim. It would focus on a transgender teen named Micayla and the actions following a leaked picture of her in the girls' bathroom taken by a former friend. It was released to Amazon Prime Video on July 20, 2019. In 2019, Jennings made a guest appearance on the fifteenth season of the ABC program, What Would You Do?. Jennings voiced the character Lily the Fairy in the 2019 episode "Cedric & the Fairies" of The Bravest Knight, an animated series.

Personal life
In 2012, Jennings discussed her sexual orientation with Barbara Walters during her 20/20 interview, saying she is romantically attracted to boys and that she harbored some apprehension about dating because of her transgender identity. In a Q&A video posted to her YouTube channel in July 2014, Jennings stated that she is pansexual, and that she loves people "for their personality", regardless of their sexual orientation or gender status. In 2013, Jennings publicly discussed her wish of becoming a mother in the future.

In an interview published in the April 11, 2018 People, Jennings revealed that per her surgeons' instructions, she had lost at least  in order to have gender reassignment surgery, which was scheduled for June 20, 2018. While the surgery was successful, Jennings suffered complications that required another follow-up procedure. Jennings has said she struggles with mental health issues and weight gain. In an Instagram post, Jennings said she has binge eating disorder. Following her acceptance to Harvard, Jennings began to binge eat, gaining nearly 100 pounds, which caused her to delay her entry into college. She claims her family has fat shamed her.

References

External links

 
 Purple Rainbow Tails
 TransKids Purple Rainbow Foundation

Activists from Florida
American child activists
American children's writers
American Jews
American LGBT rights activists
American women memoirists
American YouTubers
Harvard University alumni
LGBT Jews
LGBT media personalities
Transgender memoirists
LGBT people from Florida
LGBT YouTubers
Living people
Pansexual people
Participants in American reality television series
Pseudonymous women writers
Transgender Jews
Transgender women
Women civil rights activists
Writers from Florida
2000 births
20th-century LGBT people
21st-century American memoirists
21st-century American women writers
21st-century American writers
21st-century LGBT people
21st-century pseudonymous writers
American transgender writers